Since 1878, there have been two Broadway theatres that have carried the name the Bijou Theatre during their histories.

1239 Broadway

The first theatre to carry the Bijou name was the Theatre Brighton, which also served as an opera house and silent movie venue throughout its history. Located at 1239 Broadway between 30th and 31st Streets, had been converted from a drinking and gambling establishment into a theatre for variety, and opened August 26, 1878, with Jerry Thomas as proprietor. The house had many changes and names until John A. McCaull, a Baltimore lawyer, and Charles E. Ford took charge of it. Considerable money was spent and when they reopened the house on March 31, 1880, as the Bijou Opera-house, it looked like a modern and well-regulated theatre. In 1881 and 1882, Lillian Russell appeared in three different operettas.

But the house proved too small to be profitable, so after the performance of July 7, 1883, preparations for tearing it down began. R. E. J. Miles and Gen. W. B. Barton leased the premises for five years from its owner, Edward F. James. They agreed to advance sufficient funds to erect a new house, which was designed by J. B. McElfatrick & Son and opened December 1, 1883, as the Bijou Theatre. The first production was Orpheus and Eurydice, an adaption by Max Freeman of Jacques Offenbach's Orfée aux enfers."

Adonis, starring Henry E. Dixey, played its record-breaking run of 603 performances at the Bijou beginning September 4, 1884. Another long run was The Music Master, starring David Warfield, transferred from the Belasco Theatre on January 9, 1905, and playing 511 performances, for a total at the two theaters of 635, before closing September 29, 1906. The next big hit was A Gentleman from Mississippi, starring Thomas A. Wise and Douglas Fairbanks, which opened September 29, 1908.  From June 29 to August 7, 1909, it played at the Aerial Gardens atop the New Amsterdam Theatre, with new scenery and costumes, moving back to the Bijou August 9. After giving its 400th performance (counting the Aerial Gardens) on August 25, the play closed on September 18.

The Bijou was later used as a silent movie house. It was demolished in 1915 and replaced by the present high-rise office building, which opened in 1917.

Selected shows
 Adonis (1884–86; 603 perf.)
 A Midnight Bell (1889; 136 perf.)
 The Widow Jones (1895), basis for 1896 Edison short film The Kiss
 Courted Into Court (1896–97; 140 perf.)
 Sister Mary by Glen MacDonough (1889-1900; 120 perf.) 
 The Climbers by Clyde Fitch (1901; 163 perf.)
 The Auctioneer by Charles Klein (1901; 105 perf.)
 Nancy Brown (1903; 112 perf.)
 A Gentleman from Mississippi (1908–09)
 The Music Master (1905–06; 627 counting 124 shows at Belasco)
 The Lottery Man (1909–10; 200 perf.)

209 West 45th Street

The second Bijou Theatre was built by the Shubert family in 1917 at 209 W. 45th Street in New York City, and was the smallest of the houses they operated with a capacity of 603. Although it did not keep the planned name of the Theatre Francais, it retained its French decor. It was one of three theaters that hosted the premiere season of the musical Fancy Free—but primarily it presented plays by many writers, including Sacha Guitry, John Galsworthy, A. A. Milne, James M. Barrie, Herman J. Mankiewicz, Leslie Howard, Anton Chekhov, Henrik Ibsen, Luigi Pirandello, Graham Greene, Eugene O'Neill, William Saroyan, and Seán O'Casey.

The Oscar-winning British film The Red Shoes played the Bijou for 107 weeks, from October 21, 1948, to November 13, 1950.

Starting on November 16, 1950, as the Bijou, it hosted the film Cyrano de Bergerac, starring José Ferrer.

In 1951, it became a CBS radio studio, thenas the D. W. Griffith Theatreit presented art films, and was subsequently reduced in size due to the expansion of the adjacent Astor. It was reinstated as the Bijou Theatre in 1965, and was home to arguably its largest hit—Mummenschanz—but was demolished in 1982 to make room for the Marriott Marquis Hotel.

References

Theatres completed in 1878
Former Broadway theatres
Demolished theatres in New York City
Demolished buildings and structures in Manhattan
Former theatres in Manhattan
Buildings and structures demolished in 1915
Buildings and structures demolished in 1982
Theatres completed in 1917